Optivus agastos, also known as the violet roughy, is a species in the family Trachichthyidae. Its name, "Optivus", means chosen in Latin, and "agastos" comes from Greek meaning "near kinsman," which refers to its similarity to Optivus elongatus.

References

External links
 Fishes of Australia : Optivus agastos

violet roughy
Fauna of New South Wales
Fauna of Victoria (Australia)
Fauna of Tasmania
violet roughy